The 1960 Stanford Indians football team represented Stanford University in the 1960 NCAA University Division football season. Stanford was led by third-year head coach Jack Curtice, and played their home games on campus at Stanford Stadium in Stanford, California.

This was the second winless season in Stanford history, after the 1947 season; these were the only two winless seasons in the history of Stanford football.

Schedule

References

External links
 Game program: Stanford vs. Washington State at Spokane – September 17, 1960

Stanford
Stanford Cardinal football seasons
College football winless seasons
Stanford Indians football